Ngul may refer to:

Ngul Island
Ngul language